Viola Harris (July 5, 1920 – August 23, 2017) was an American actress known for roles in television, theater and film from the 1950s to the 2010s.

Career 
Harris appeared in a number of films including Woody Allen's Deconstructing Harry in 1997, Choke in 2008, The Other Guys in 2010, and Sex and the City 2 in 2010.

In 2010, she starred in the short film, The Secret Friend, directed by Flavio Alves. Harris received positive reviews for her role in the film. Phil Hall of Film Threat, who gave the film a positive score for example, argued that Harris "truly deserves to be in the center of the spotlight."

On stage, Harris worked in summer stock theatre for a number of years. She also was a standby for the Broadway production of Zelda (1969).

Family

She was married to actor Robert H. Harris until his death in 1981 at 70. They have one son, Steven Lee.

Death
Harris died August 23, 2017, in New York City at age 97. She was interred at Cedar Park Cemetery in Paramus, New Jersey. Her funeral was held at the Plaza Jewish Community Chapel in New York, New York, where she was a member.

Filmography

References

External links

1920 births
2017 deaths
American film actresses
American television actresses
American stage actresses
Northwestern University alumni
Hunter College alumni
Jewish American actresses
Actresses from New York City
21st-century American Jews
21st-century American women